Yaqubabad (also Romanized as Ya‘qūbābād; also known as Ya‘qūbābād-e Kheyrābād) is a village in Ramjin Rural District, Chaharbagh District, Savojbolagh County, Alborz Province, Iran. At the 2006 census, its population was 77, in 24 families.

References 

Populated places in Savojbolagh County